Penthema is an east Asian genus of satyrine butterflies.

Species
Penthema adelma (C. & R. Felder, 1862) China.
Penthema binghami Wood-Mason, 1881 – blue kaiser Burma, Thailand 
Penthema darlisa Moore, 1878
Penthema formosanum Rothschild, 1898
Penthema lisarda (Doubleday, 1845) – yellow kaiser

References

Satyrinae
Butterfly genera
Taxa named by Edward Doubleday